Luciano Francisco Comella (1751–1812) was a Spanish playwright. Author of more than two hundred plays, he was one of the most prolific dramatists of the late eighteenth century.

His work is inspired by the zarzuela and operetta which were really popular at the time. Numerous of his plays emphasis on war and Spanish middle classes.

References

1751 births
1812 deaths
Spanish male dramatists and playwrights
18th-century Spanish journalists